Jesús Díaz (1941–2002) was a Cuban writer.

References

1941 births
2002 deaths

Cuban male writers
People from Havana